David Samuel Brandt is an attorney and politician from Montserrat who served as the island's 6th Chief Minister from 22 August 1997 to 5 April 2001. As of June 18, 2019, Brandt has been remanded at Her Majesty's Prison in Montserrat until the beginning of his trial in November 2019.

Sex crimes
In September 2015, Brandt was charged with two counts of conspiracy to have sexual intercourse with a minor. He was released on EC$20,000 bail. In November 2018, Brandt was arrested again and subsequently charged with 2 counts of child sexual exploitation and 1 count of perverting the course of justice. He was released on bail in the amount of EC$90,000. The Government of the United Kingdom through the National Crime Agency has spent more than £200,000 to investigate Brandt's alleged child sex abuse.

References

Further reading 
 "Former Montserrat Chief Minister retires from active politics", 19 August 2009, CSME Network News. Retrieved Jan 5, 2011.
 "Montserrat Honours Former Legislators", 27 November 2009, Government of Montserrat. Retrieved Jan 5, 2011.

Montserratian politicians
Chief Ministers of Montserrat
Living people
Year of birth missing (living people)
Heads of government who were later imprisoned